Zerrin Tekindor (born 5 August 1964) is a Turkish actress and painter.

Biography 
In 1985 she graduated from the Hacettepe University State Conservatory, School of Theater. In that year, she began to work at the Adana State Theatre as an intern. After two years she was charged with a duty in Ankara at the State Theatre and performed in numerous plays such as: Laundry, Ferhad and Sirin, A Noisy and Clamorous Story, Death, Istanbul Efendisi, Last of the Red Hot Lovers, Skylight, From War to Peace, From Love to Quarrel, Love Kills, The Government Inspector, A Place in the Middle of the Earth. In 2003 she moved to Istanbul to work at the Istanbul State Theatre. In 2004 she performed in The Government Inspector (N. V. Gogol) as Anna Andreyevna. She won an Afife Theatre Award for Best Supporting Actress in Comedy.

Besides her theatre career, Zerrin Tekindor also studied painting as a special student at the Bilkent University School of Fine Arts between 1990-1994 in the Halil Akdeniz Workshop. The heroes of many plays are settled on her canvas as Tekindor's figures by using mixed technique. With their costumes, actions, lines, and even with their appearances under the stage light, they become paintings, being filtered through Tekindor's interpretation who is also part of that particular action on the stage.

Zerrin Tekindor has a son with actor Çetin Tekindor. At present, Zerrin Tekindor continues her career as an actress and a painter in Istanbul. Since 1992, she has held nineteen personal exhibitions.

Theatre 

 A Streetcar Named Desire : Tennessee Williams - ID İletişim & BKM - 2017
 Who's Afraid of Virginia Woolf? : Edward Albee - Oyun Atölyesi - 2013
 Antony and Cleopatra : William Shakespeare - Oyun Atölyesi & Shakespeare's Globe - 2012
 God of Carnage : Yasmina Reza - Istanbul State Theatre - 2009
 Dünyanın Ortasında Bir Yer : Özen Yula - Istanbul State Theatre - 2007
 The Government Inspector : Nikolai Gogol - Istanbul State Theatre - 2003
 Love Kills : Vladimir Volkoff -Ankara State Theatre - 1999
 Savaştan Barışa, Aşktan Kavgaya : Recep Bilginer - Ankara State Theatre - 1999
 Geyikler Lanetler : Murathan Mungan - Ankara State Theatre - 1999
 Skylight : David Hare - Ankara State Theatre - 1997
 İstanbul Efendisi : Musahipzade Celal - Ankara State Theatre - 1995
 Last of the Red Hot Lovers : Neil Simon - Ankara State Theatre - 1995
 Death : Woody Allen - Ankara State Theatre - 1994
 İstanbul Efendisi : Musahipzade Celal - Ankara State Theatre - 1993
 Gürültülü Patırtılı Bir Hikaye : Savaş Dinçel - Ankara State Theatre - 1993
 Ferhat ile Şirin : Nâzım Hikmet - Ankara State Theatre - 1992
 Laundry : D. Durvin\H. Prevest - Ankara State Theatre - 1991
 Woman in Mind : Alan Ayckbourn - Ankara State Theatre - 1987

Filmography

TV series
 Cafe Casablanka
 Mars Kapıdan Baktırır
 Aşk-ı Memnu, Mademoiselle Deniz de Courton - 2008–2010
 Yaprak Dökümü, Gişe Memuru (guest appearance) - 2010
 Kuzey Güney, Gülten Çayak - 2011–2013
 Kurt Seyit ve Şura, Yazar - 2014
 Kara Sevda, Leyla Acemzade - 2015–2017
 Şahin Tepesi, Tuna Akdora - 2018
 Zemheri, Aliye Pınar - 2020
 Mucize Doktor, Vuslat Kosoğlu - 2021
 Between the World and Us - Burçin - 2022
 Yüz Yıllık Mucize - Süreyya - 2023–

Film
 Pek Yakında - 2014
 İkimizin Yerine - 2016
 İstanbul Kırmızısı - 2017
 Müslüm - 2018

References

1964 births
Living people
Turkish film actresses
Turkish television actresses
Turkish artists
People from Burhaniye
Hacettepe University alumni